George Willie Gray (27 February 1896–1962) was an English footballer who played in the Football League for Norwich City and The Wednesday.

References

1896 births
1962 deaths
English footballers
Association football defenders
English Football League players
Grimsby Town F.C. players
Norwich City F.C. players
Sheffield Wednesday F.C. players